Gustave Preiss (2 July 1881 – 7 January 1963) was a Swiss cinematographer known for his work in Weimar Germany.

He learned the profession of filmmaker very young, by participating in the traveling cinema of his father, Louis Preiss Senior.

From 1906, he joined his brother, Louis Preiss in order to operate his own traveling cinema, "The Royal Bio".

In 1908, following the death of his brother, he moved to Austria where he ran a cinema in Tepliz-Schonau.

Between 1912 and 1932 he had a brilliant career as a filmmaker in Berlin, then he left Germany for Switzerland when the National Socialist party won the elections.

From 1932 to 1952, he operated his own cinematographic laboratory in Zürich, where he produced most of the equipment himself.

Selected filmography
 The Outcasts / Ritual Murder (1919)
 Humanity Unleashed (1920)
 The Air Pirates (1920)
 The Black Tulip Festival (1920)
 A Debt of Honour (1921)
 The Amazon (1921)
 Nathan the Wise (1922)
 The Golden Net (1922)
 The Unwritten Law (1922)
 Helena (1924)
 The Girl from Capri (1924)
 Prater (1924)
 Mother and Child (1924)
 The Golden Calf (1925)
 One Minute to Twelve (1925)
 The Three Mannequins (1926)
 The Armoured Vault (1926)
 Circus Romanelli (1926)
 The Poacher (1926)
 Young Blood (1926)
 Why Get a Divorce? (1926)
 The White Slave (1927)
 My Aunt, Your Aunt (1927)
 The City of a Thousand Delights (1927)
 When the Young Wine Blossoms (1927)
 The False Prince (1927)
 Lotte (1928)
 Love in the Cowshed (1928)
 Five Anxious Days (1928)
 Violantha (1928)
 The Woman Everyone Loves Is You (1929)
 German Wine (1929)
 Roses Bloom on the Moorland (1929)
 The Love Market (1930)
 Death Drive for the World Record (1929)
 Rooms to Let (1930)

References

Bibliography
 Bock, Hans-Michael & Bergfelder, Tim. The Concise CineGraph. Encyclopedia of German Cinema. Berghahn Books, 2009.

External links

1881 births
1963 deaths
Swiss cinematographers